This is a list of stations on the Turin Metro.

Metro Line 1 (red)
Fermi
Paradiso
Marche
Massaua
Pozzo Strada
Monte Grappa
Rivoli
Racconigi
Bernini
Principi d'Acaja
XVIII Dicembre
Porta Susa
Vinzaglio
Re Umberto
Porta Nuova
Marconi
Nizza
Dante
Carducci-Molinette
Spezia
Lingotto
Italia' 61
Bengasi

Route map

See also

Turin Metro
Turin
Piedmont

Turin
Turin
Turin Metro
Metro stations